Beyond: Two Souls is an interactive drama and action-adventure game for the PlayStation 3, PlayStation 4 and Windows, developed by Quantic Dream and published by Sony Computer Entertainment. It was originally released on 8 October 2013 for the PlayStation 3, later being re-released for the PlayStation 4 on 24 November 2015 and Windows on 22 July 2019. The game features Jodie Holmes, one of two player characters. The other is an incorporeal entity named Aiden: a separate soul linked to Jodie since birth. Jodie, who is portrayed by actor Elliot Page, possesses supernatural powers through her psychic link to Aiden, growing from adolescence to adulthood while learning to control Aiden and the powers they share. Willem Dafoe co-stars as Nathan Dawkins, a researcher in the Department of Paranormal Activity and Jodie's surrogate-father-figure. The actors in the game worked during the year-long project in Quantic Dream's Paris studio to perform on-set voice acting and motion-capture acting.

Despite being a video game, Beyond: Two Souls premiered at the 2013 Tribeca Film Festival, marking only the second time the film festival recognised a video game. David Cage, writer and director of the game, explained that game development studios should provide "interactive storytelling" that can be played by everyone, including non-gamers. The game received polarised critical reception upon its release, and sold 2.8 million units by July 2018.

Gameplay 
Beyond: Two Souls is an interactive drama and action-adventure game, requiring the player to move and guide the character into interactions with objects and other non-player characters in the scene to progress the story. The player primarily controls Jodie through the in-game environments. At almost any time, however, the player (or second player during a two-player game) can switch to control Aiden instead. Aiden, as an incorporeal entity, exists permanently in noclip mode and can move through walls, ceilings, and other obstacles; however, he is limited to moving only within a certain radius around Jodie due to their spiritual tethering.

While playing as Jodie, the game includes interactive objects marked with a white dot, which can be interacted with by tilting the controller stick in its direction. If Jodie must perform a specific action, icons pop up on the screen to prompt the player to press and/or hold certain controller buttons. Conversation prompts float in the air, defaulting to a certain choice if too much time passes before selection. During action sequences, like chases or hand-to-hand combat, the cinematography moves into slow motion whilst Jodie performs the physical manoeuvre; during this time, the player must determine the direction Jodie is moving and push the controller stick in that direction to complete the action. Other sequences require real-time stealth, which has the player sneak Jodie through environments while coordinating certain actions with Aiden. Failing certain action sequences will alter the course of a chapter (and sometimes later chapters) and in some cases lead to the death of a non-playable character.

While playing as Aiden, the game becomes monochromatic. Amongst the shades of greys, interactive objects are highlighted by an aura shining in one of several colours, with the colour of the aura indicating his potential interaction: orange characters can be possessed, red characters strangled, blue objects (or characters with environmental effects) knocked around, and green characters healed. Jodie frequently calls upon Aiden to provide different abilities, such as form a protective shield around her, allow the dead to speak to the living through her, grant her an ability to see events of the recent past, and enable her to heal a character's wounds.

As the player makes choices throughout the game, the gameplay's plot is revealed. Besides affecting dialogue and story developments, the outcome of entire scenes (and in some cases, the outcome of scenes several chapters later) can be manipulated to a certain extent based on player choices. These choices are typically moral decisions made through Jodie's dialogue options, interventions with various characters, success or failure in her combat scenes, or psychic actions that the player chooses to have Aiden perform. Examples of choice-based outcomes are the chapter titled The Party, where the player is given the choice of unleashing brutal revenge toward a group of bullies or simply running away, and the chapter titled The Embassy, where the player can either engage in psychic information retrieval or can jeopardise the mission by forcing one of the guards to commit suicide. Choices also determine the finale of Beyond: Two Souls, as any number of possible plot endings can be experienced by the player.

Plot 
Young Jodie Holmes (Caroline Wolfson) lives with her foster parents in a suburban home. Since birth, Jodie has had a psychic connection with a mysterious entity named Aiden, with whom she can communicate and perform telepathic acts, such as possessing people's minds and manipulating certain objects. After an incident with some neighbourhood kids results in Aiden almost killing one of them, Jodie's foster parents seek help to care for her condition, permanently leaving her under the custody of doctors Nathan Dawkins (Willem Dafoe) and Cole Freeman (Kadeem Hardison) of the United States Department of Paranormal Activity.

Under the two doctors' care, Jodie slowly learns to control Aiden and the powers they share. During this time, Nathan and Cole are building the condenser, a portal that connects the world of the living with the world of the dead—the Infraworld. One night, Nathan learns that his wife and daughter were killed in a car accident. While trying to comfort him, Jodie discovers that she can channel spirits of the dead from the Infraworld; she helps the spirits speak to the living through a psychic link created by her physical contact. As the years pass, a teenage Jodie (Elliot Page) seeks her independence, both from the doctors and from Aiden, and tries several times to live a normal life. At each attempt, Aiden intervenes, ending in disaster.

At one point, Nathan asks for Jodie's help with the condenser, which has broken open. After braving hostile entities from the Infraworld, Jodie manages to shut down the condenser and warns Nathan not to build another. This gets the attention of the CIA, who send agent Ryan Clayton (Eric Winter) to forcibly recruit Jodie. After training, the now-adult Jodie goes on multiple missions as a field agent, often with Ryan, to whom she slowly becomes attracted. On one such mission in Somalia, Jodie is assigned to kill a warlord, only to realize afterwards that the target she killed was not a warlord, but the country's benign president. Enraged, Jodie flees in disgust, despite Ryan's pleas. Branded a traitor, Jodie becomes a fugitive, evading pursuing CIA forces. Along the way, she befriends a small group of homeless people, one of whom she helps give birth to a girl named Zoey, and she lives with a family of Native Americans, during which she saves them from a malevolent entity. The CIA eventually recaptures Jodie after she attempts to reconnect with her catatonic biological mother, who has been held and forcibly drugged for decades in a military hospital.

The CIA hands Jodie over to Nathan, now executive director of the DPA, overseeing the DPA's newest condenser, code-named the Black Sun. He reveals that the CIA is willing to let Jodie go if she agrees to a final mission. Jodie and a CIA team led by Ryan destroy an underwater facility housing a Chinese-developed condenser before it is used to attack the United States. Jodie then learns that Nathan built a miniature condenser to speak exclusively to his family, but without success. After showing Nathan that his refusal to let them go is only making them suffer, Jodie tries to leave, only to be held in captivity by the CIA—the organisation has deemed her too dangerous to be free and intends to subject her to the same fate as her mother. The now-insane Nathan informs Jodie that he intends to shut down the containment field to the Black Sun, merging the two worlds together and making death meaningless. Too weak to free Jodie, Aiden contacts Ryan and Cole, leading them to her. After Nathan shuts down the containment field, the three chase after him into the heart of the Black Sun, with the intent of destroying it.

During the trek towards the Black Sun, Cole is injured by entities and Ryan sacrifices his own safety to keep Jodie alive. Eventually, Jodie confronts Nathan near the Black Sun. Nathan is either killed by Aiden or commits suicide to reunite with his family. As Jodie shuts down the condenser, she has a vision—Aiden is her stillborn twin brother. Jodie must make a choice: go back to the world of the living, or go on to the Infraworld and be reunited with everyone she has lost. If Jodie chooses Life, her connection to Aiden is severed and she is no longer useful to the CIA. Jodie must choose how to live her life, either alone or with Ryan, Jay, or Zoey and her family. If Jodie chooses Beyond, she joins Aiden and other lost ones in the Infraworld, dying in the process. She continues to watch over those who remain in the living world, warning the now-teenage Zoey of the coming danger. By the story's end, the Infraworld has become a widespread threat in the not-so-distant future. Either Jodie, Zoey, or both of them prepare to confront the threat.

Development 

David Cage, founder and CEO of Quantic Dream, announced Beyond: Two Souls at Sony's press conference during the Electronic Entertainment Expo 2012. He showed the crowd a debut trailer featuring the game's in-game graphics. When he was asked to compare Beyond: Two Souls to Quantic Dream's previous game Heavy Rain, Cage described Beyond as a "more action-driven experience" that offers "much more direct control" and "much more spectacular action" than the 2010 thriller. Cage has called his games "fully controllable" while admitting "when there is an action sequence, yes we integrate these quick time event sequences ... in a new way." Unlike Quantic Dream's previous game, Beyond was not to be PlayStation Move compatible. Earlier games created by Cage, which have been called "wrought psychological thrillers", demonstrate that emotional narrative is a critical element in a Quantic Dream game's development. The script for the game was around 2,000 pages long (an average screenplay is between 95 and 125 pages long; each page is approximately one minute of screen time). "We'd do 30, 40 pages a day. It's insane compared to a film," Page said in an interview. "Jodie goes through a lot. This is an incredibly emotional story and journey for this girl."

Quantic Dream, an advanced motion capture studio as well as video game developer, required the Beyond: Two Souls actors to perform motion-capture acting as well as on-set voice acting. Actors cast in the game worked during the year-long project in the Paris studio to perform the physical actions seen onscreen as performed by their fully realised video game graphic characters. Meanwhile, Quantic Dream programmers, artists, and animators, led by art director Christophe Brusseaux, designed the computer-generated imagery seen in the game. David Cage provided writing and direction and Guillaume de Fondaumière was the executive producer.

Beyond: Two Souls is dedicated to composer Normand Corbeil, who died of pancreatic cancer on 25 January 2013. Corbeil had worked on Quantic Dream's Heavy Rain and its predecessor Fahrenheit and was unable to finish his work on Beyond. Lorne Balfe, who wrote the score for Assassin's Creed III, replaced Corbeil as the game's composer after Corbeil's death. Balfe's collaborator Hans Zimmer joined him as producer in August 2013.

On 27 April 2013, five months before the game's debut, Quantic Dream released a new trailer and demonstrated 35 minutes of the game at the 2013 Tribeca Film Festival, with both Page and Cage in attendance. This marks only the second time the film festival recognised a video game, the first being 2011's L.A. Noire. In interviews conducted immediately prior to the game's worldwide release, Cage explained that development studios like Quantic Dream have an obligation to provide "interactive storytelling" that can be played by everyone, including non-gamers.

Release 
On 5 September 2013, the PlayStation Blog announced that a demo for Beyond: Two Souls would be released 1 October 2013 in the United States, 2 October for Europe, and 3 October for Japan, about a week prior to the full game's worldwide release. Despite the demo's official release date, a few users of the paid subscription service PlayStation Plus were allowed to receive the demo a week earlier, on 24 September 2013. GameStop also gave out a limited number of beta keys on that day. The full game was released on 8 October 2013 in North America, 9 October 2013 in Europe, Australia and New Zealand, and 11 October 2013 in the UK.

The European version of the game is censored to keep the PEGI rating at 16 instead of 18. Two changes were made amounting to 5–10 seconds of gameplay.

Immediately after the game was released, nude images of Jodie surfaced on the Reddit online community. Jodie appears nude in a shower scene in the game, but is not fully visible. Industry analysts deduced that a person in possession of a developer PlayStation 3 that allowed quality assurance features such as "free camera" mode had created and uploaded the images. Sony immediately took steps to remove them, asking for the community's assistance. They explained that the images were of a digital model and not of Page, who had a "no nudity" policy. The images were removed from the website.

In June 2015, Quantic Dream announced a PlayStation 4 version of Beyond: Two Souls for North America, Europe, and the PAL region alongside Heavy Rain. The PlayStation 4 version of Beyond: Two Souls was released on 24 November, with the remaster of Heavy Rain following on 1 March 2016. A package containing both games was then released physically on a Blu-ray disc.

During the 2019 Game Developers Conference in March, Epic Games announced that Quantic Dream would publish Heavy Rain, Beyond: Two Souls and Detroit: Become Human for Windows, with the releases occurring throughout 2019. The games were exclusively available through the Epic Games Store for the duration of a year following their release before they appear on other storefronts. On 16 May 2019, the date of release for Beyond: Two Souls, which was to be self-published by Quantic Dream, was revealed as 22 July 2019, with a demo made available on 27 June 2019.

Reception 

Beyond: Two Souls received polarised reviews upon release. Review aggregator Metacritic described its reception as "mixed". Critics praised Page's character portrayal of Jodie Holmes and Dafoe's performance as Nathan Dawkins, as well as the amount of technical details in the game's animations and graphics. Praise was also generally given toward the elaborate motion capture, interactive storytelling mechanics, emotional soundtrack, and ability to appeal to non-gamers. PlayStation Official Magazine (UK) spoke frankly of a game using quick time events over a more acceptable solution: "you lose explicit control", yet believing Beyond ultimately wins in ways such as its imagery: "PS3's graphical high point" and Page's performance: "Astonishing ... she's the lynchpin that holds all the madness together with a painfully human presence." Polygon was less impressed with the game's writing, but was exhilarated about Quantic Dream's ability to "perfect a new way of telling stories" with "staggeringly great" motion capture. GameSpot called the game a "gripping adventure", observing that the gameplay's choices give the player an ability to shape what kind of person Jodie becomes, making us "care dearly for her ... and become enamoured with this young woman and her extraordinary life". Game Revolution praised the game as "uncannily gorgeous", confirming Quantic Dream remains a leader in the story-driven genre, calling their high-quality cinematic gameplay "the saving grace of Beyond: Two Souls". GamesTM labeled Page's performance as "truly breathtaking ... one of the truly great videogame acting showcases" and described Cage as "visionary; someone who believes in the power of games and of interactivity. Beyond: Two Souls is his most ambitious and complete work to date."

While Electronic Gaming Monthly praised the visuals, the performances, and the "bold, genre-defying design work", it expressed disappointment in Quantic Dream; respecting its years of "audacity" pushing the boundaries of the game medium, yet ultimately failing to listen to feedback and instead delivering yet "another flawed experiment—better in some ways, worse in others". GamesRadar+ praised the game's innovation, stunning amount of choices, and Page's performance, but warned "you'll never be truly challenged by the gameplay". IGN gaming website criticised the game for offering a gaming experience too passive and unrewarding: "It is unwise to build up our expectations of being able to choose our actions and then take that away from us where it feels most important" and a muddy and unfocused interactive drama "to make gamers conditioned to meaningless violence feel something". Joystiq criticised the game's lack of solid character interaction and its unbelievable, unintentionally silly plot. Destructoid criticised the game's thin character presentation and frequent narrative dead ends, as well as its lack of meaningful interactivity. The editor of Eurogamer took issue with the "gruelling, sentimental" game being "all story", comparing it to other games that "give the player complete control", observing the triviality of the player choices may modify the tone of each self-contained chapter, but the overall story is "going wherever it's going". Entertainer Ben "Yahtzee" Croshaw of Zero Punctuation was heavily critical of the game, focusing on the overuse of quick time events, the underuse of the game's central stealth mechanics, and the inconsistent tone and atmosphere, comparing playing the game to "watching any normal film and pressing the pause button every two seconds".

Sales 
It was reported in July 2013 that Beyond: Two Souls was in the top twenty most pre-ordered games of 2013, and that by the end 2013, the game sold one million copies worldwide during its first three months of availability. The game sold over 70,000 copies in Quantic Dream's home country France during that time, more than its previous game Heavy Rain during its three-month debut. Heavy Rain budget was $22 million and the budget for Beyond: Two Souls was $27 million, not including approximately $18 million in costs for marketing and distribution.

By July 2018, Beyond: Two Souls had sold 2.8 million copies, becoming one of the best-selling PlayStation 3 video games.

Accolades

Legacy 
In November 2014, David Cage discussed the future of video games and referred to the constant changes occurring within the gaming industry. "There will always be games for the hardcore gamers who see games as a skill-based sport, or as a way to compete with their friends", he said. He also referred to casual gamers who play games "as a mere hobby, like many titles for smartphones". He then stated, "We try to develop a middle way, with games that try to tell a story, to carry meaning, and where violence isn't the core activity. Most of all, we try to create an emotion, to make players live something strong and unique, which remains an ambitious challenge in a video game."

Notes

References

External links 
 
 
 

2013 video games
Action-adventure games
Central Intelligence Agency in fiction
Video games about death
Video games about ghosts
Interactive movie video games
Video games about the paranormal
PlayStation 3 games
PlayStation 4 games
PlayStation Network games
Video games about psychic powers
Science fiction video games
Sony Interactive Entertainment games
Video games about spirit possession
Video games developed in France
Video games featuring female protagonists
Video games scored by Lorne Balfe
Video games set in Somalia
Video games set in the United States
Video games set in Seattle
Video games set in a fictional country
Video games with alternate endings
Windows games
Multiplayer and single-player video games
Quantic Dream